Mohamed Sakho (born 5 August 1988 in Conakry), is a Guinean footballer, who currently plays for the Moroccan side Olympique Safi.

Career
At the end of 2007, Mohamed Sakho played for Étoile du Sahel at the World Club Championship in Japan, having won the CAF Champions League and the Tunisian league title. Additionally, Sacko won the Bronze Medal at the World Club Championship in Japan and subsequently won the CAF Super Cup with Etoile Sportive du Sahel at the end of February 2008 and signed in July 2009 for Olympique Beja.

International career
Sacko was one of the twenty-three players of the Syli National ("National Elephant") who participated at the 2008 26th African Nations Cup (CAN) tournament in Ghana, West Africa, where the National Elephant reached the quarter final for the third consecutive time in six years (2004 in Tunisia, 2006 in Egypt, and 2008 in Ghana). Along with Mohamed Dioulde Bah of Strasbourg football club (a French 1st Division team), Sacko was one of the young Syli National players that impressed at the 2008 CAN.

Sacko was one of several players who featured in all four matches played by the National Elephant at the 2008 CAN.

External links
 Player profile - ES Sahel

References

1988 births
Living people
Sportspeople from Conakry
Guinea international footballers
Expatriate footballers in Tunisia
2008 Africa Cup of Nations players
Guinean footballers
Guinean expatriate footballers
Étoile Sportive du Sahel players
Olympique Béja players
Hafia FC players
Denizlispor footballers
Guinean expatriate sportspeople in Tunisia
Expatriate footballers in Turkey
Expatriate footballers in Morocco
AS Gabès players
Horoya AC players
Association football midfielders